Oakey–Cooyar Road is a continuous  road route in the Darling Downs and Toowoomba regions of Queensland, Australia. The entire route is signed as State Route 68. It is a state-controlled part regional and part district road (number 417).

 It provides an alternate route between the Warrego Highway and the New England Highway, bypassing .

Route description
The former route of the Warrego Highway through the town, now known as Oakey Connection Road is the basis from which other roads emanate. Thus the Oakey–Cooyar Road starts at its junction with Oakey Connection Road, which is the TMR designated point. State Route 68 does not end at that point, but follows Oakey Connection Road and Oakey–Pittsworth Road until it meets the Warrego Highway. For convenience this article describes the full length of State Route 68.

The road commences at an intersection with the Warrego Highway in Oakey. It runs generally north through Oakey, following Oakey–Pittsworth Road, Aubigny Road, Campbell Street and Bridge Street until it reaches the TMR designated point where Oakey–Cooyar Road leaves the Oakey Connection Road. It crosses the railway line and continues out of town as Davidson Street and Blake Road before becoming Oakey–Cooyar Road as it passes the Oakey Army Aviation Centre.

It runs north through rich crop-growing land until it reaches the Pechey–Maclagan Road in Highland Plains, where it turns west then north, north-west and north as Pechey–Maclagan Road. This road eventually exits to the west in  while Oakey–Cooyar road continues north.

From there it continues north-east through , where it ends at an intersection with the New England Highway.

Road condition
The road is fully sealed.

History

Pastoral runs were taken up in the areas around Oakey from the early 1840s. A pastoral run was also established at Cooyar.

The Western railway line opened from Toowoomba to Dalby in 1868, with a station at Oakey, allowing the town to grow as a centre of commerce for properties around it. In 1877 large amounts of land were resumed from several pastoral runs and made available for selection, with the aim of establishing many small farms in the more accessible areas.

Early roads to the north of Oakey were cut to enable access to the pastoral runs and their outstations. With the advent of small farms and towns came a need for more and better roads. Road construction and maintenance was difficult on the rich soils of the Darling Downs, leading to requests for a railway. While waiting for a railway, which did not arrive until 1912-13, many improvements were made to the roads. The railway operated until 1964, when improvements in road construction and motor vehicle reliability rendered it non-competitive.

Major intersections
All distances are from Google Maps.

See also

 List of road routes in Queensland
 List of numbered roads in Queensland
 Jondaryan Woolshed

Notes

References

Roads in Queensland